Gustaw Morcinek (born Augustyn Morcinek; 25 August 1891 – 20 December 1963) was a Polish writer, educator and later member of Sejm from 1952 to 1957. He is considered one of the most important writers from Silesia.

Biography
In 1891, Morcinek was born in Karviná into a poor family, the youngest of four siblings. In 1892, his father Józef died and his mother was forced to provide for the family. Augustyn started work in the coal mine at the age of 16, which was quite late compared to the standard of those times. When he was 19, miners raised money for his education and he started attending a teachers' seminary in Biała Krakowska, from which he graduated in 1914. In 1914 he was drafted into the Austro-Hungarian Army and after 1918 served briefly in the Polish Army. In 1920, when Cieszyn Silesia was divided between Poland and Czechoslovakia, his hometown Karviná fell to Czechoslovakia. Morcinek was a pro-Polish activist and thus decided to stay in Poland. In the 1920s and 1930s he worked as a teacher in Skoczów.

Interwar period
During the interwar period, Morcinek published many articles in various Silesian press. He wrote his most important books in the late 1920s and early 1930s becoming the only notable Silesian Polish-language prosaist of the interwar period. His works concentrate mostly on coal mining and Silesian themes. Morcinek shows miners' work and life in a realistic way and accentuates the class character of national oppression of Polish miners. Morcinek spent the years 1936-1939 abroad, in Western Europe.

World War II
He returned to Poland shortly before the outbreak of World War II. Morcinek was arrested by the Gestapo on 6 September 1939. He was initially imprisoned with Władysław Dworaczek and the rest of people belonging to the Polish intellectuals from Silesia. Gustaw spent the whole war in the Nazi concentration camps Skrochowitz, Sachsenhausen and Dachau. The supposed reason given for his arrest was his "anti-German activity" before the war and the fact that a dog in one of his novels ("Wyrąbany chodnik") was called "Bismarck". When he was in concentration camps, he was given a choice to sign a Volksliste but refused.

After the war

From his release until November 1946, Morcinek resided in France, Italy and Belgium and cooperated with Polish émigré press there. He then returned to Silesia, Poland, and settled in Katowice. He was then actively supported by new authorities. Morcinek resumed his writing and continued to concentrate on Silesian issues but widen his scope to books for children and also epistolography. He received many recognitions and literary awards for his work and many of his books were translated and published abroad. Gustaw Morcinek died of leukemia on 20 December 1963 in Kraków and was later buried at Communal Cemetery in Cieszyn.

Political activity
Morcinek was politically active from a young age. He was an active advocate of joining the whole Cieszyn Silesia to Poland. During the interwar period when he was an anti-German activist, some critics accused him of spreading hatred. After the war, he was a supporter of Polish United Workers' Party and was a member of the Sejm (parliament) from Katowice electoral district (1952–1957).

Works

Novellas and novellas collections
 Noc listopadowa (1927)
 W kwietniową noc (1928)
 Zgaszony płomyk (1928)
 O te świętą ziemeczkę (1929)
 Serce za tamą (1929)
 Cisza (1930)
 Miód w sercu (1930)
 Chleb na kamieniu (1931)
 Na bieda-szybie (1932)
 Sześć dni (1932)
 Dzieje węgla (1933)
 Kataryniarz (1933)
 W zadymionym słońcu (1933)
 Uśmiech na drodze (1935)
 Gołębie na dachu (1936)
 Po kamienistej drodze (1936)
 W najmłodszym lesie (1937)
 Maszerowa (1938)
 Miasteczko nad rzeką (1938)
 Królewski dług (1939)

Short story collections
 Byli dwaj bracia (1930)
 Wyrąbany chodnik (1931–32)
 Inżynier Szeruda (1937)
 Wyorane kamienie (1939)
 Dziewczyna z Pól Elizejskich (1946)
 Listy z mojego Rzymu (1946)
 Wróżbita (1946)
 Dwie korony (1948)
 Zagubione klucze (1948)
 Pod gongiem (1949)
 Pokład Joanny (1951)
 W Nysie na rynku (1952)
 Odkryte skarby (1953)
 Ondraszek (1953)
 W Wiergulowej dziedzinie (1953)
 Viktoria (1954)
 Wskrzeszenie Herminy (1956)
 Z mojej ziemi (publicystyka) (1956)
 Judasz u Monte Sicuro (1957)
 Czarna Julka (1959)
 Siedem zegarków kopidoła Joachima Rybki (1960)
 Opowieści o ludziach z pociągu (1963)
 Górniczy zakon (1964)

Fairy tales collections
 Jak górnik Bulandra diabła oszukał (1961)
 Przedziwne śląskie powiarki (1961)
 Przedziwna historia o zbójniku Ondraszku (1963)

Books for children
 Narodziny serca (1932)
 Gwiazdy w studni (1933)
 Łysek z pokladu Idy (1933)
 Ludzie są dobrzy (1935)
 Miasteczko nad rzeką (1938)

Other works
 Śląsk (1933)
 Listy spod morwy (1945)
 Listy spod morwy (1946)
 Zabłąkane ptaki
 Urodzaj ludzi
 Ziemia cieszyńska

Footnotes

References

 

 

 

1891 births
1963 deaths
Writers from Karviná
Austro-Hungarian military personnel of World War I
Polish Austro-Hungarians
Polish military personnel
Polish male writers
Polish educators
Polish communists
Polish people from Zaolzie
Recipients of the Order of Polonia Restituta
Deaths from leukemia
Deaths from cancer in Poland
Sachsenhausen concentration camp survivors
Dachau concentration camp survivors
Members of the Polish Sejm 1952–1956
Recipients of the State Award Badge (Poland)